Mundelein may refer to:

 George Mundelein, cardinal archbishop of the Roman Catholic diocese of Chicago, Illinois
 Mundelein, Illinois, a village in suburban Chicago named for George Cardinal Mundelein
 Mundelein College, a Roman Catholic college for women, located in Chicago
 Mundelein Seminary, a Roman Catholic seminary, officially known as the University of Saint Mary of the Lake
 Mundelein High School, a high school in Mundelein, Illinois